Before Breakfast is a 1919 American short comedy film starring Harold Lloyd.

Cast
 Harold Lloyd as The Boy
 Snub Pollard
 Bebe Daniels
 Sammy Brooks
 Lew Harvey
 Noah Young

See also
 List of American films of 1919
 Harold Lloyd filmography

References

External links

1919 films
1919 short films
1919 comedy films
Silent American comedy films
American silent short films
American black-and-white films
Films directed by Hal Roach
American comedy short films
1910s American films